A Bunch of Violets may refer to:

 A Bunch of Violets (play), a play by Sydney Grundy 
 A Bunch of Violets (film), a film directed by Frank Wilson